Stenacris vitreipennis, known generally as the glassy-winged toothpick grasshopper or glassy-winged locust, is a species of spur-throat toothpick grasshopper in the family Acrididae. It is found in North America and South America.

References

Acrididae
Articles created by Qbugbot
Insects described in 1836